Leopold is a residential eastern suburb of Geelong and is a gateway to the Bellarine Peninsula. At the 2016 census, Leopold had a population of 12,814.

History
The area was formerly known as Kensington, but was renamed in 1892 after Prince Leopold, Duke of Albany, the youngest son of Queen Victoria. The post office opened as Kensington on 19 May 1858, and was renamed Kensington Hill in 1882, Leopold Hill in 1884 and Leopold in 1885.

Heritage listed sites

Leopold contains a number of heritage listed sites, including:

 221-229 Matthews Road, Melaleuka
 715-729 Bellarine Highway, St Marks On The Hill

Today
The Bellarine Rail Trail passes through Leopold. The Gateway Plaza is situated on the corner of the Bellarine Peninsula and Melaluka road.

Leopold is constructing four new residential developments called the Kensington Estate, the Estuary Estate, the Debonair Heights Estate and the Gateway Estate. Much of the available land has been sold. Houses are either in construction or others near finished.

The town has an Australian rules football team competing in the Geelong Football League known as the Lions.

The Leopold Sportsmans Club provides bowls green, squash, function rooms and other facilities.

Leopold is also home to Lake Connewarre—a Ramsar listed estuary.

The town has a tennis club featuring 8 hard courts that competes in Geelong regional competitions.

Education 
As of 2012, Leopold consists of three sources of education.
 Leopold Primary School
 Leopold Kindergarten
 Allanvale Preschool Centre

References

"Census Populations 2011"

Suburbs of Geelong
Towns in Victoria (Australia)
Bellarine Peninsula